Turkmenistan has participated at the 2019 Summer Universiade in Naples, Italy.

References

Sport in Turkmenistan
Nations at the 2019 Summer Universiade